Concrete poetry is an arrangement of linguistic elements in which the typographical effect is more important in conveying meaning than verbal significance. It is sometimes referred to as visual poetry, a term that has now developed a distinct meaning of its own. Concrete poetry relates more to the visual than to the verbal arts although there is a considerable overlap in the kind of product to which it refers. Historically, however, concrete poetry has developed from a long tradition of shaped or patterned poems in which the words are arranged in such a way as to depict their subject.

Development
Though the term ‘concrete poetry’ is modern, the idea of using letter arrangements to enhance the meaning of a poem is old. Such shaped poetry was popular in Greek Alexandria during the 3rd and 2nd centuries BCE, although only the handful which were collected together in the Greek Anthology now survive. Examples include poems by Simmias of Rhodes in the shape of an egg, wings and a hatchet, as well as Theocritus’ pan-pipes.

The post-Classical revival of shaped poetry seems to begin with the Gerechtigkeitsspirale (spiral of justice), a relief carving of a poem at the pilgrimage church of St. Valentin, Kiedrich. The text is carved in the form of a spiral on the front of one of the church pews and created in 1510 by master carpenter Erhart Falckener. But the heyday of the revival of shaped poetry came in the Baroque period when poets, in the words of Jeremy Adler, "did away with the more-or-less arbitrary appearance of the text, turned the incidental fact of writing into an essential facet of composition, and thereby…created a union of poetry with the visual arts". There were already precedents for this in Micrography, a technique for creating visual images used by Hebrew artists, which involves organizing small arrangements of Biblical texts such that they form images which illustrate the subject of the text. Micrography allowed the creation of images of natural objects by Jews without directly breaking the prohibition of creating "graven images" that might be interpreted as idolatry. The technique is now used by both religious and secular artists and is similar to the use of Arabic texts in Islamic calligraphy.

Early religious examples of shaped poems in English include "Easter Wings" and "The Altar" in George Herbert's The Temple (1633) and Robert Herrick's "This crosstree here", which is set in the shape of a cross, from his Noble Numbers (1647). Secular examples include poems on the subject of drinking in the shape of wine flagons by Rabelais and Charles-François Panard (1750), supplemented by the elaborate goblet of Quirinus Moscherosch (1660), the playful "A Toast" (Zdravljica, 1844) by France Prešeren, with stanzas in the shape of wine-glasses,  and The Mouse's Tale, a shaped poem published in 1865 by Lewis Carroll. 

The approach reappeared at the start of the 20th century, initially in the Calligrammes (1918) of Guillaume Apollinaire, with poems in the shape of a necktie, a fountain and raindrops running down a window, among other examples. In that era also there were typographical experiments by members of avant-garde movements such as Futurism, Dada and Surrealism in which lay-out moved from an auxiliary expression of meaning to artistic primacy. Thus the significance of the sound poetry in Marinetti’s Zang Tumb Tumb (1912) is expressed through pictorial means. Similarly in Germany Raoul Hausmann claimed that the typographic style of his 'Phonemes' allowed the reader to recognise what sound was intended. In Russia the Futurist poet Vasily Kamensky went so far as to term the typography of his Tango with Cows, published in 1914, 'ferro-concrete poems' (zhelezobetonnye poemy), long before the name became current elsewhere.

A further move away from overt meaning occurred where 'poems' were simplified to a simple arrangement of the letters of the alphabet. Louis Aragon, for example, exhibited the sequence from a to z and titled it "Suicide" (1926), while Kurt Schwitters' "ZA (elementary)" has the alphabet in reverse, and the Catalan writer Josep Maria Junoy  (1885-1955) placed just the letters Z and A at the top and bottom of the page under the title "Ars Poetica".

Post-war concrete poetry
During the early 1950s two Brazilian artistic groups producing severely abstract and impersonal work were joined by poets linked to the São Paulo magazine Noigandres who began to treat language in an equally abstract way. Their work was termed "concrete poetry" after they exhibited along with the artists in the National Exhibition of Concrete Art (1956/57). The poets included Augusto de Campos, Haroldo de Campos and Décio Pignatari, who were joined in the exhibition by Ferreira Gullar, Ronaldo Azeredo and Wlademir Dias Pino from Rio de Janeiro. In 1958 a Brazilian concrete poetry manifesto was published and an anthology in 1962.

Dom Sylvester Houédard claimed that it was the 1962 publication in The Times Literary Supplement of a letter from the Portuguese E.M. de Melo e Castro that awakened British writers such as himself, Ian Hamilton Finlay and Edwin Morgan to the possibilities of Concrete Poetry. However, there were by this time other European writers producing similar work. In 1954 the Swedish poet and visual artist Öyvind Fahlström had published the manifesto Hätila Ragulpr på Fåtskliaben. Similarly in Germany Eugen Gomringer published his manifesto vom vers zur konstellation (from line to constellation), in which he declared that a poem should be "a reality in itself" rather than a statement about reality, and "as easily understood as signs in airports and traffic signs". The difficulty in defining such a style is admitted by Houédard’s statement that "a printed concrete poem is ambiguously both typographic-poetry and poetic-typography".

  
Another difficulty of definition is caused by the way such works cross artistic boundaries into the areas of music and sculpture, or can alternatively be defined as sound poetry, visual poetry, found poetry and typewriter art. Henri Chopin's work was related to his musical treatment of the word. Kenelm Cox (1927–68) was a kinetic artist "interested in the linear, serial aspects of visual experience but particularly in the process of change," whose revolving machines transcended the static page in being able to express this. Ian Hamilton Finlay’s concrete poetry began on the page but then moved increasingly towards three dimensional figuration and afterwards to site-specific art in the creation of his sculpture garden at Little Sparta. The Italian Maurizio Nannucci's Dattilogrammmi experiments (1964/1965) were also transitional, preluding his move into light art.

Bob Cobbing, who was also a sound poet, had been experimenting with typewriter and duplicator since 1942. Of its possibilities in suggesting the physical dimension of the auditory process, he declared that "One can get the measure of a poem with the typewriter’s accurate left/right & up & down movements; but superimposition by means of stencil and duplicator enable one to dance to this measure." Houédard’s entirely different work was also produced principally on the typewriter but approximates more to painterly and sculptural procedures. So too does that of the American Minimalist artist Carl André, beginning from about 1958 and in parallel with his changing artistic procedures. And in Italy Adriano Spatola (1941–88) developed the artistic fragmentation of language using various visual techniques in his Zeroglifico (1965/6).

Edwin Morgan’s experiments with concrete poetry covered several other aspects of it, including elements of found poetry ‘discovered’ by misreading and isolating elements from printed sources. "Most people have probably had the experience of scanning a newspaper page quickly and taking a message from it quite different from the intended one. I began looking deliberately for such hidden messages…preferably with the visual or typographical element part of the point." Another aspect of the search for unintended concordances of meaning emerges in A Humument, the lifework of the visual artist Tom Phillips, who uses painterly and decorative procedures to isolate them on the page.

Despite such blurring of artistic boundaries, concrete poetry can be viewed as taking its place in a predominantly visual tradition stretching over more than two millennia that seeks to draw attention to the word in the space of the page, and to the spaces between words, as an aid to emphasising their significance. In recent years, this approach has led Mario Petrucci to suggest that the "extreme example" of concrete poetry can be seen as nested within the larger concept of Spatial Form. Starting from the observation that poetry can usually be told from prose simply by looking at it, this reading of Spatial Form encompasses the many aspects of subtle visual significance that are held, for instance, by typeface or in the textures of repeated letters, as well as the more overt visual signals generated by the poem’s layout.

See also
Calligram
Carmen figuratum
List of concrete and visual poets
Lyco art
Something Else Press
Visual poetry
ASCII Art

Bibliography
Jeremy Adler ‘'Technopaignia, Carmina Figurata and Bilder-Reime. Seventeenth¬Century Figured Poetry in Historical Context’', Comparative Criticism IV (1982), pp. 107–147.
 Jeremy Adler and Ulrich Ernst  Text als Figur. Visuelle Poesie von der Antike bis zur Moderne, Herzog August Bibliothek Wolfenbüttel and VCH, Acta Humaniora, Weinheim, Third edition, 1990.
 Bäckström, Per. “Fahlström stannade i Stockholm. ’HÄTILA RAGULPR PÅ FÅTSKLIABEN’ och diktarkonferensen i Sigtuna 1953”, Edda 2019 no. 1.
 Bäckström, Per. “Words as things. Concrete Poetry in Scandinavia”, Cahiers de la nouvelle Europe: special issue Transfers, Appropriations and Functions of Avant-Garde in Central and Northern Europe, 1909–1989, Paris: L’Harmattan, 2012.
 Bob Cobbing (ed), GLOUP and WOUP, Gillingham 1974.
 Peter Finch (ed), Typewriter Poems, Cardiff 1972.
 Dick Higgins, Pattern Poetry: Guide to an Unknown Literature, State University of New York, 1987.
 Nigel McLoughlin (ed), The Portable Poetry Workshop, Palgrave 2017 (Part I:12, Spatial Form); Print , Electronic .
 Maurizio Nannucci, Exempla, Anthology of concrete and visual poetry, Florence 1970.
 John Sharkey (ed), Mindplay, an anthology of British Concrete Poetry, London 1971.
 Dencker, Klaus Peter (Trans.Harry Polkinhorn) 'From Concrete to Visual poetry' Kaldron-online & Light & Dust Anthology of Poetry 2000.

References

Further reading
 Medium-Art, Selection of Hungarian Experimental Poetry, editors Zoltan Frater and Andras Petocz, published by Magvető, 1990, Budapest, 
 Rasula, Jed and Steve McCaffery: Imagining Language: An Anthology, The MIT Press, 2001
 Solt, Mary Ellen:Concrete Poetry: A World View,  Indiana University Press, 1970
 Robert G. Warnock and Roland Folter:  "The German Pattern Poem", in Festschrift Detlev Schumann, Munich 1970, pp. 40–73
 Greg Thomas: Border Blurs: Concrete Poetry in England and Scotland, 2019, Liverpool University Press

External links
Concrete Poetry: A World View by Mary Ellen Solt on UbuWeb, which hosts a large amount of concrete poetry (Visual Poetry)
Ancient Greek pattern poems

Graphic poetry
Latin American literature
Poetry movements